Technical Higher Secondary School, Vattamkulam is a secondary school in Vattamkulam, Malappuram district, Kerala.
THSS Vattamkulam Managed by IHRD is located at nellyssery, Vattamkulam Near Naduvattam, Edappal Malappuram

External links
 School website

References

High schools and secondary schools in Kerala
Schools in Malappuram district